The Nete is a river in northern Belgium, right tributary of the Rupel. It flows through the Belgian province of Antwerp. It is formed in Lier, at the confluence of the rivers Grote Nete and Kleine Nete. It flows through Duffel and joins the river Dijle in Rumst to form the river Rupel. It drains nearly 60% of Antwerp province.

Grote Nete
The Grote Nete (Big Nete) river is about 85 km long and has its source near Hechtel in the Belgian province of Limburg. It flows in western direction along the towns Geel, Westerlo and Heist-op-den-Berg before joining the Kleine Nete in Lier. Its main tributaries are the  near Geel, the  near Westerlo, and the  near Herenthout.

Kleine Nete
The Kleine Nete (Small Nete) river is about 50 km long and has its source near Retie in the Belgian province of Antwerp. North of the Grote Nete flows in south-western direction along the towns Herentals and Nijlen before joining the Grote Nete in Lier. Tributaries, all coming from the North, include the  near Kasterlee, the } near Grobbendonk, and the  near  Nijlen.

History
During the French occupation of the Southern Netherlands (1792–1815) there was a département named after the river Nete, see Deux-Nèthes.

Natural landscapes
On the valley of the Grote Nete lies the Scheps natural landscape, between Olmen and Scheps.

References

Rivers of Belgium
Rivers of Antwerp Province